Podgraje is a village southeast of Ilirska Bistrica in the Inner Carniola region of Slovenia, towards the border with Croatia.

The parish church in the settlement is dedicated to Our Lady of Mount Carmel and belongs to the Koper Diocese.

References

External links
Podgraje on Geopedia

Populated places in the Municipality of Ilirska Bistrica